UMD may refer to:

Education 

 University of Maryland, College Park, US
 University of Michigan–Dearborn, US
 University of Minnesota Duluth. US

Other uses 

 Union for Multiparty Democracy, a political party in Tanzania
 Universal Media Disc, an optical disc format
 Uummannaq Heliport, Greenland, IATA code